Kalameh (also Romanized as Kalmeh; also known as Kalimeh) is a city in Bushkan District of Dashtestan County, Bushehr province, Iran. At the 2006 census, its population was 1,937 in 436 households. The following census in 2011 counted 2,164 people in 569 households. The latest census in 2016 showed a population of 2,463 people in 736 households.

References 

Cities in Bushehr Province
Populated places in Dashtestan County